The WAGR S class was a two-member class of 0-6-0WT tank locomotives operated by the Great Southern Railway (GSR) and later Western Australian Government Railways (WAGR).

History
In August 1888, a Kitson & Co, Leeds built a 0-6-0WT locomotive named Princess entered service on the GSR for use in Albany, it was joined by a second named Duchess on 1 May 1892. Both were included in the December 1896 takeover of the GSR by the WAGR and became the S class, numbered S162 and S163. They were withdrawn in 1915 and 1916 respectively, and later sold to the Commonwealth Government, operating construction trains at the Henderson Naval Base before moving to Canberra in 1923 during the construction of Parliament House.

In 1927 both were sold to NSW Associated Blue Metal Quarries and numbered 1 and 2. The latter was scrapped in 1932 while the former having operated at Prospect Quarry, was scrapped at Bass Point Quarry, Shellharbour in 1938.

Class list
The numbers, names and periods in service of each member of the class were as follows:

Namesakes
The S class designation was reused when the S class locomotives were introduced in 1943. It was reused again in the 1990s when the Westrail S class diesel locomotives entered service.

See also

History of rail transport in Western Australia
List of Western Australian locomotive classes

References

Notes

Cited works

External links

Kitson locomotives
Railway locomotives introduced in 1888
S WAGR class (1888)
0-6-0T locomotives
3 ft 6 in gauge locomotives of Australia
Shunting locomotives